The Sexual Health is a peer-reviewed academic journal that covers research on sexual health. It is the official journal of the International Union against Sexually Transmitted Infections (IUSTI), Asia-Pacific, and the Asia-Oceania Federation of Sexology. Its editors are Christopher Fairley (from Monash University) and Roy Chan (from National Skin Centre, Singapore).

Abstracting and indexing
The journal is abstracted and indexed in: 
 Applied Social Sciences Index and Abstracts
 Australasian Medical Index
 CAB Abstracts
 CINAHL
 Current Contents/Clinical Medicine
 Current Contents/Social & Behavioural Sciences
 EBSCO/EBSCO Discovery
 Embase
 Journal Citation Reports/Science Edition
 Journal Citation Reports/Social Sciences Edition
 ProQuest (Ex Libris)
 PubMed/MEDLINE
 SciSearch
 Science Citation Index Expanded
 Scopus
 Social Sciences Citation Index
 Social Services Abstracts
 Sociological Abstracts

References

External links 
 

Sexology journals
English-language journals
Reproductive health journals
Publications established in 2004
Bimonthly journals
CSIRO Publishing academic journals